Phnom Tumpor (Tumpor Mountain) is a mountain in Pursat Province of western Cambodia. There is a village nearby named Tumpor that lies on the Stung Pouthisat River.

References

Tumpor
Tumpor
Villages in Cambodia
Populated places in Pursat province